Serre is a French surname. Notable people with the surname include:

 Chantal Serre
 Claude Serre (1938–1998), French cartoonist
 Henri Serre (born 1931), French actor
 Jean-Pierre Serre (born 1926), French mathematician active in algebraic geometry, number theory and topology
 Louis Serre (disambiguation), multiple people
 Marine Serre (born 1991), French fashion designer
 Nathalie Serre (born 1968), French politician

See also
 Benoît Serré (1951–2019), Canadian politician
 Josephus Serré (1907–1991), Dutch athlete
 Gaetan Serré (1938–2017), Canadian politician
 Marc Serré (born 1967), Canadian politician

French-language surnames